Nokul or lokum is a type of puff pastry from the Turkish cuisine. It is common in the Central Black Sea Region of Turkey and the Turkish-minority areas of Bulgaria with variations. Nokul is sometimes served hot as an appetizer instead of bread. It consists of a rolled sheet of yeast dough onto which feta-style white cheese, walnut or poppy seed is sprinkled over a thin coat of butter. The dough is then rolled, cut into individual portions, and baked.

Variations 
Nokul with peynir (Peynirli nokul)
Nokul with beef (Etli nokul)
Nokul with tahin (Tahinli nokul)
Nokul with walnut (Cevizli nokul)
Nokul with poppy seed (Haşhaşlı nokul)
Nokul with hazelnut (Fındıklı nokul)

Regional nokul styles

See also

Bejgli
Cantiq
Cozonac
Lokma
Nut roll
Pogaca
Poppy seed roll
Tsoureki
Nazook

References

External links
https://www.hurriyet.com.tr/lezizz/sevilen-yoresel-lezzet-nokul-nasil-yapilir-nokul-tarifi-41083607
https://www.yenisafak.com/gundem/selcukludan-gunumuze-kalan-lezzet-nokul-2650983
Turkish cuisine
Bulgarian cuisine
Yeast breads
Appetizers
Turkish breads
Tatar cuisine
Puff pastry